Frea mniszechi is a species of beetle in the family Cerambycidae. It was described by Thomson in 1858. It is known from Cameroon, Gabon, the Democratic Republic of the Congo, the Central African Republic, the Ivory Coast, and the Republic of the Congo.

References

mniszechi
Beetles described in 1858